Sidney Joseph Bechet (May 14, 1897 – May 14, 1959) was an American jazz saxophonist, clarinetist, and composer. He was one of the first important soloists in jazz, and first recorded several months before trumpeter Louis Armstrong. His erratic temperament hampered his career, and not until the late 1940s did he earn wide acclaim. Bechet spent much of his later life in France.

Biography

Early life 
Bechet was born in New Orleans in 1897 to a middle-class Creole of color family. Bechet's father Omar was both a shoemaker and a flute player, and all four of his brothers were musicians as well.

His older brother, Leonard Victor Bechet, was a full-time dentist and a part-time trombonist and bandleader. Bechet learned and mastered several musical instruments that were kept around the house (he began on the cornet), mostly by teaching himself; he decided to specialize in the clarinet (which he played almost exclusively until about 1919).

At the age of six, he started to perform with his brother's band at a family birthday party, debuting his talents to acclaim. Later in his youth, Bechet studied with Joseph "King" Oliver, Bunk Johnson, Freddie Keppard, Lorenzo Tio, "Big Eye" Louis Nelson Delisle, and George Baquet.

Musical development 
Bechet played in many New Orleans ensembles using the improvisational techniques of the time (obbligatos with scales and arpeggios and varying the melody). 
While working with Louis Armstrong, Bechet was the first musician to develop the Swing style of jazz; he influenced the widening difference between jazz and ragtime. Bechet liked to have his sound dominate in a performance, and trumpeters reportedly found it difficult to play alongside him.

He performed in parades with Freddie Keppard's brass band, the Olympia Orchestra, and in John Robichaux's dance orchestra. From 1911 to 1912, he performed with Bunk Johnson in the Eagle Band of New Orleans and in 1913–14 with King Oliver in the Olympia Band. From 1914 to 1917, he was touring and traveling, going as far north as Chicago and frequently performing with Freddie Keppard.

In the spring of 1919, he traveled to New York City where he joined Will Marion Cook's Syncopated Orchestra. Soon after, the orchestra traveled to Europe; almost immediately upon arrival, they performed at the Royal Philharmonic Hall in London. The group was warmly received, and Bechet was especially popular.

While in London, he discovered the straight soprano saxophone and developed a style unlike his clarinet tone. Bechet was the first influential soprano saxophonist, and led to its rising popularity in jazz.

His saxophone sound could be described as emotional, reckless, and large. He often used a broad vibrato, similar to some New Orleans clarinetists at the time. In 1919, Ernest Ansermet, a Swiss classical music conductor, wrote a tribute to Bechet, one of the earliest (if not the first) to a jazz musician from the field of classical music, linking Bechet's music with that of Bach.

Bechet's first recordings were made in 1923 and 1924. The session was led by Clarence Williams, a pianist and songwriter, better known at that time for his music publishing and record producing, and his "Blue Five" (which included Louis Armstrong). Bechet recorded "Wild Cat Blues" and "Kansas City Man Blues". The former is in a ragtime style with four 16-bar themes, and the latter is a 12-bar blues. In 1924, Bechet worked with Duke Ellington for three months and made a significant impact on Ellington's early jazz style. 
Duke Ellington called him "the epitome of jazz." However, he never learned how to read music in his lifetime of being a musician.

Bechet in France 

On September 15, 1925, Bechet and other members of the Revue Nègre, including Josephine Baker, sailed to Europe, arriving at Cherbourg, France, on September 22. The revue opened at the Théâtre des Champs-Élysées in Paris on October 2. The show was an example of negrophilia in France at the time. He toured Europe with multiple bands, reaching as far as Russia in mid-1926. In 1928, he led his small band at Chez Bricktop (run by the popular Ada "Bricktop" Smith) in Montmartre, Paris.

In France, Bechet found that he was appreciated by a wider audience and had more general freedom than he did in the United States.

He was imprisoned in Paris for eleven months. In his autobiography, he wrote that he accidentally shot a woman when he was trying to shoot a musician who had insulted him. He had challenged the man to duel and said, "Sidney Bechet never plays the wrong chord." After his release, he was deported to New York, arriving soon after the stock market crash of 1929. He joined with Lorenzo Tio and also came to know trumpeter Roy Eldridge.

In 1932, Bechet returned to New York City to lead a band with Tommy Ladnier. The band, consisting of six members, performed at the Savoy Ballroom. He played in Noble Sissle's orchestra, which toured in Germany and Russia.

Later life 
In 1938, "Hold Tight, Hold Tight (Want Some Seafood Mama)", commonly known as "Hold Tight", was composed by Bechet's guitarist Leonard Ware and two session singers with claimed contributions from Bechet himself. The song became known for its suggestive lyrics and then for a series of lawsuits over songwriter royalties.

In 1939, Bechet and the pianist Willie "The Lion" Smith led a group that recorded several early versions of what was later called Latin jazz, adapting traditional méringue, rhumba and Haitian songs to the jazz idiom. On July 28, 1940, Bechet made a guest appearance on the NBC Radio show The Chamber Music Society of Lower Basin Street, playing two of his showpieces ("Shake It and Break It" and "St. Louis Blues") with Henry Levine's Dixieland band. Levine invited Bechet into the RCA Victor recording studio (on 24th Street in New York City), where Bechet lent his soprano sax to Levine's traditional arrangement of "Muskrat Ramble". On April 18, 1941, as an early experiment in overdubbing at Victor, Bechet recorded a version of the pop song "The Sheik of Araby", playing six different instruments: clarinet, soprano saxophone, tenor saxophone, piano, bass, and drums. A hitherto unissued master of this recording was included in the 1965 LP Bechet of New Orleans, issued by RCA Victor as LPV-510. In the liner notes, George Hoeffer quoted Bechet:

"I started by playing The Sheik on piano, and played the drums while listening to the piano. I meant to play all the rhythm instruments, but got all mixed up and grabbed my soprano, then the bass, then the tenor saxophone, and finally finished up with the clarinet."In 1944, 1946, and 1953, he recorded and performed in concert with the Chicago jazz pianist and vibraphonist Max Miller; private recordings from Miller's archive have never been released. These concerts and recordings are described in John Chilton's biography Sidney Bechet: The Wizard of Jazz.

With jobs in music difficult to find, he opened a tailor shop with Ladnier. They were visited by musicians and played in the back of the shop. In the 1940s, Bechet played in several bands, but his financial situation did not improve until the end of that decade. By the end of the 1940s, Bechet had tired of struggling to make music in the United States. His contract with Jazz Limited, a Chicago-based record label, was limiting the events at which he could perform (for instance, the label would not permit him to perform at the 1948 Festival of Europe in Nice). He believed that the jazz scene in the United States had little left to offer him and was getting stale.

In 1958, Bechet performed as a soloist and with various other renowned musicians including Buck Clayton and Sarah Vaughn in memorable, spirited concerts in the United States Pavilion at Expo 58, the World's Fair in Brussels, Belgium.

Permanent settlement in Paris 
In 1951, he migrated to France permanently, after his performance as a soloist at the Paris Jazz Fair caused a surge in his popularity in that country, where he easily found well-paid work. Also in 1951, he married Elisabeth Ziegler in Antibes.

In 1953, he signed a recording contract with Disques Vogue that lasted for the rest of his life. He recorded many hit tunes, including "Les Oignons", "Promenade aux Champs-Élysées", and the international hit "Petite Fleur". He also composed a classical ballet score in the late Romantic style of Tchaikovsky called La nuit est une sorcière ("The Night Is a Witch"). Some existentialists in France took to calling him le dieu ("the god").

Autobiography and death 
Shortly before his death, Bechet dictated his autobiography, Treat It Gentle, to Al Rose, a record producer and radio host. He had worked with Rose several times in concert promotions and had a fractious relationship with him. Bechet's view of himself in his autobiography was starkly different from the one Rose knew.

"The kindly old gentleman in his book was filled with charity and compassion. The one I knew was self-centered, cold, and capable of the most atrocious cruelty, especially toward women."

Although embellished and frequently inaccurate, Treat It Gentle remains a staple account for the "insider's view of the New Orleans tradition."

Bechet died in Garches, near Paris, of lung cancer on May 14, 1959 on his 62nd birthday. He is buried in a local cemetery. Several other major jazz musicians died this year as well: Billie Holiday and Lester Young.

Legacy 
In 2013, a crater on Mercury was named after Bechet.

In the novel Steppenwolf by Hermann Hesse, Bechet was inspiration for the character "Pablo."

Bechet's music has been included in the soundtracks of about 60 films, including the following: JFK (1991), Chocolat (2000), The Quiet American (2002), and Midnight in Paris (2011).

Philip Larkin wrote a poem called "For Sidney Bechet". It can be found in "The Complete Poems". It is written about on the Philip Larkin Society website.

Van Morrison mentions Sidney Bechet in the song "See Me Through Part II (Just A Closer Walk With Thee)" from the 1990 album Hymns to the Silence: "...Sidney Bechet on Sunday afternoons in winter/Sidney Bechet, Sunday afternoons in winter..."

In Antibes, France, a small one-block park is named Sidney Bechet Square in his honor. The park contains a monument with a bust of Bechet and a plaque that reads, "To Sidney BECHET, one of the world's greatest jazz musicians, so honored by his new home. - Sidney J. BARTHELEMY, Mayor of New Orleans, April 16, 1994."

A fictionalized Sidney Bechet appears in two episodes of George Lucas's The Young Indiana Jones Chronicles portrayed by Jeffrey Wright.

Personal life 
Bechet was Catholic.

Bechet was known for having an abrasive attitude, which has been compared to that of Coleman Hawkins. They were both incredibly sure of their relative importance in the music industry during a time in which jazz was losing popularity. They were stubborn and lacked patience with younger artists who had less experience or knowledge about the jazz industry.

Bechet briefly took time off of the music industry in 1938, when he opened a tailor shop in New York.

Bechet had three wives: Elizabeth Ziegler (1951–death), Marie-Louise Crawford (1934–1942), and Norma Hale (1918–1929).

Awards
 DownBeat magazine Hall of Fame, 1968
Bechet was inducted into the Big Band and Jazz Hall of Fame, 1983.
Awarded a blue plaque outside his former London home, 2014 (pictured).

Discography

Singles
"Texas Moaner Blues", with Louis Armstrong, 1924
"Cake Walkin' Babies from Home", with Red Onion Jazz Babies, 1925
"Got the Bench, Got the Park (But I Haven't Got You)", 1930
"Blues in Thirds", 1940
"Dear Old Southland", 1940
"Egyptian Fantasy", 1941
"Muskrat Ramble", 1944
"Blue Horizon", 1944
"Dutch Swing College Blues", 1954
"Kansas City Man Blues", 1954
"Petite Fleur", 1959
"Dans les Rues D'Antibes", 1960
"Premier Bal", 1960
"Who's Sorry Now", 1961
"Weary Blues", 1979

Albums 

 "A Jazz Masterwork", 1948
 "Sidney Bechet & Claude Luter", 1950
 "Jazz Classics Vol. 1", 1950
 "Jazz Classics Vol. 2", 1950
 "Sidney Bechet - Bunk Johnson: Days Beyond Recall", 1951
 "Sidney Bechet, Claude Luter: On Parade", 1951
 "Sidney Bechet, Claude Luter, Andre Reweliotty et son Orchestre: Bechet-Souvenirs", 1951
 "Sidney Bechet, Muggsy Spanier: Jam Session", 1952
 "Sidney Bechet", 1952
 "Port of Harlem Six", 1952
 "Soprano Sax Solos", 1952
 "French Movies", 2014

Movies 

Bechet was featured in three films and played a jazz musician.

 Série noire,
 L'inspecteur connaît la musique,
 Quelle équipe!

Further reading
American Peoples Encyclopedia Yearbook (1953). p. 542.
Bechet, Sidney (1960). Treat It Gentle. Twayne. Reprint, Da Capo, 1978.
Chilton, John ((1987). Sidney Bechet, The Wizard of Jazz. New York, Oxford University Press. ISBN 0-19-520623-1.
Hoefer, George (1946). Article in Metronome Magazine, December 1946.

References

External links

Sidney Bechet at the Red Hot Jazz Archive
Profile with pictures
Sidney Bechet in Switzerland: A preservation project by the United Music Foundation
 Sidney Bechet recordings at the Discography of American Historical Recordings.
France: Jazz Musician Sidney Bechet Buried In Paris Suburb: No Farewell Blues. 1959
NPR: The Sidney Bechet Story
10 Essential Recordings of Bechet's Tunes

1897 births
1959 deaths
20th-century American composers
20th-century American saxophonists
African-American jazz musicians
American emigrants to France
American jazz clarinetists
American jazz composers
American jazz soprano saxophonists
American male saxophonists
Deaths from lung cancer in France
Dixieland clarinetists
Dixieland saxophonists
Blue Note Records artists
Gennett Records artists
Okeh Records artists
Jazz musicians from New Orleans
Jazz soprano saxophonists
Louisiana Creole people
American male jazz composers
20th-century American male musicians
Olympia Orchestra members
The Eagle Band members
Red Onion Jazz Babies members
African-American Catholics
Jazzology Records artists
20th-century jazz composers
20th-century African-American musicians